Elsa García Rodriguez (born February 8, 1990) is a Mexican artistic gymnast who represented Mexico at the 2012 Summer Olympics. She was also awarded the Longines Prize for Elegance during the 2009 World Artistic Gymnastic Championships. Having won 35 medals in international competition, she is widely regarded as the greatest female Mexican gymnast of all time.

Senior career

2006 
In March, Garcia placed fifth at the American Cup in Philadelphia, United States with a score of 57.050.

In April, Garcia competed at the Pacific Rim Championships in Honolulu, United States.  She contributed a vault score of 14.650 toward Mexico's team sixth-place finish.

In July, Garcia competed at the 2006 Central American and Caribbean Games in Cartagena, Colombia.  She contributed an all around score of 57.250 toward Mexico's team first-place finish.  She placed first in the all around final with a score of 58.332.  In event finals, she placed third on vault scoring 14.062, first on uneven bars scoring 15.150, and first on floor scoring 14.125.

In October, Garcia competed at the 2006 World Artistic Gymnastics Championships in Aarhus, Denmark.  Mexico placed eighteenth and individually she placed thirty third with a score of 56.525. She also was second reserve for the All Around Final.

2007 
At the beginning of March, Garcia placed third at the American Cup in Jacksonville, United States with a score of 60.200.

In March, Garcia competed at the Artistic Gymnastics World Cup event in Paris, France.  She placed third on vault scoring 14.325, sixth on uneven bars scoring 14.425, and second of floor scoring 15.100.

At the end of March, Garcia competed at the Artistic Gymnastics World Cup event in Cottbus, Germany.  She placed third on vault scoring 14.450, first on uneven bars scoring 15.250, and first on floor scoring 15.125.

In May, Garcia competed at the Artistic Gymnastics World Cup event in Ghent, Belgium.  She placed second on vault scoring 14.463 and second on floor scoring 14.675.

In July, Garcia competed at the 2007 Pan American Games in Rio de Janeiro, Brazil.  She placed seventh in the all around final with a score of 56.200.  In event finals, she placed fourth on vault scoring 14.462, fourth on uneven bars scoring 15.050, and fifth on balance beam scoring 14.525.

In September, Garcia competed at the 2007 World Artistic Gymnastics Championships in Stuttgart, Germany.  The Mexico placed twentieth and individually she placed seventy fourth in the all around competition with a score of 52.775.  Prior to the competition she injured her Psoas muscle and based on her performances she did not qualify for the 2008 Summer Olympics.  Garcia said, "2007 was a really special and contradictory year for me, because I achieved so much in the World Cup series and obviously because of my injury that left me out of Beijing."

2008 
In June, Garcia competed at the Artistic Gymnastics World Cup event in Barcelona, Spain.  She placed fourth on vault scoring 13.438 and third on uneven bars scoring 13.750.

Garcia hoped to earn a wild card spot for the 2008 Summer Olympics but did not.  "2008 was kind of frustrating, mainly because I didn't know if I would get the wild card or not. Finally I got an answer to that, and, well, you know all about that."  She added, "It was tough to continue knowing that my goal and dream was passing me by. It was hard seeing the competitions on TV in my house, but I wouldn't let myself quit. First of all, because I can't give up on something that fills me with happiness and that I still enjoy very much. Second, I know who I am, and what I am capable of doing if I set my mind to it, so there's nothing like keeping on training and setting new goals to keep myself motivated. Of course, not every day is a great day, but overcoming the hard parts is what makes us realize why we are doing this."

In December, Garcia competed at the Artistic Gymnastics World Cup final in Madrid, Spain.  She placed fourth on vault scoring 14.400 and eighth on floor scoring 13.175.  Garcia said, "The World Cup Final in Madrid came like a surprise for us, and it helped my coaches and me get the hang of things again, and to reassure me that I want to keep doing this for another four years."

2009 
At the beginning of the year. Garcia had surgery on her left hand.  She said, "There was an abnormal bone growth due to hard impacts and over-training. So I had surgery, and then had to recover from it and start little by little again. So this year I haven't competed at all. This year is the first year in the Olympic cycle, so we're taking it slow, because next year will be a busy one."

In October, Garcia competed at the 2009 World Artistic Gymnastics Championships in London, United Kingdom.  She placed twelfth in the all around final with a score of 54.875 and eighth in the vault final with a score of 13.287.  At the World Championships, Garcia was awarded with the Longines Prize for Elegance.

2010 
In March, Garcia placed eighth at the American Cup in Worcester, United States with a score of 53.900.

In July, Garcia competed at the 2010 Central American and Caribbean Games in Mayaguez, Puerto Rico.  She contributed an all around score of 55.200 toward Mexico's team first-place finish.  "Mexico really started well and ended well," Garcia said. "There were great performances from us and other countries, but in the end we got first."  She placed second in the all around final with a score of 55.950.  In event finals, she placed first on vault scoring 13.812, eighth on uneven bars scoring 11.275, second on balance beam scoring 13.675, and first on floor scoring 14.000.  Garcia said, "I think that over the past four years, the technical quality of the gymnasts in this region has improved."

In September, Garcia competed at the Pan American Championships in Guadalajara, Mexico.  She placed fourth in the all around competition with a score of 56.232. In event finals, she placed sixth on vault scoring 13.825, seventh on uneven bars scoring 13.300, fourth on balance beam scoring 13.625, and fifth on floor scoring 13.650.  "It's a good place, but I know I can improve further," Garcia said. "The objective was met. We are very happy because we were fighting on each apparatus."

In October, Garcia competed at the 2010 World Artistic Gymnastics Championships in Rotterdam, The Netherlands.  Mexico placed twenty first and individually she placed fifty first in the all around competition.

In December, Garcia had surgery to remove a Synovial cyst in her left hand.

2011 
In February, Garcia resumed training.  She said, "After surgery it was immobilized for a month with a splint. I am almost ending my second month that is filled with mobility, rehab and strengthening my hand. So I think I will be recovered completely in April, or maybe May. I am constantly visualizing myself doing the skills I do, and that makes me want to train more and more."  Garcia later added, "It was a rough and slow beginning this year because of the operation; but my hand has been fully operational since May, so I've had the chance to slowly regain and really train all the apparatuses and skills. The only times it hurts a bit is when there is a change of climate or when I do lots of vaults, but nothing serious.  After my hand operation, it took me a lot of out-of-the-gym training to regain all of my body strength. I did a lot of cardiovascular training and weight lifting, and went back to the basics in gymnastics. The skills I do were in my mind, and my body knew how to do them. I just had to regain control of my body."

In October, Garcia competed at the 2011 World Artistic Gymnastics Championships in Tokyo, Japan.  Mexico placed seventeenth and individually she placed sixty third in the all around competition.  Before the competition she said, "I can surely say that I am really excited about this year's world championships. I hope that we Mexicans show the world what we are capable of achieving, I think we can place in the top 18."

Later in October, Garcia competed at the 2011 Pan American Games in Guadalajara, Mexico.  She contributed an all around score of 52.875 towards Mexico's team third-place finish and she placed fifth in the all around final with a score of 54.425. In event finals, she placed second on vault scoring 14.312, third on uneven bars scoring 13.625, and fifth on floor scoring 13.400.

Bronze Team Final (Closing on Bars): https://www.youtube.com/watch?v=_zrIHY3L_WM&ab_channel=betweentheolympics

Vault Final:

Bars Final:

Floor Final: https://www.youtube.com/watch?v=Oep1xrCDdvI&list=PLyPMZ1t17Lk62vZ4zOI0DK8AtjdMdbSRd&ab_channel=DORTHOMGymnastics

Elsa worked together with the national team uniforms sponsor Leotardos Gilling and designed the training and competition leotards for the Mexico women national team leotards worn throughout 2011 to 2015.

2012 
In January, Garcia competed at the London Prepares series in London, United Kingdom. She placed seventeenth in the all around competition with a score of 54.631.  She injured her knee during warm-ups for the vault final.  She said, "It was a hyperextension of the ligaments around the knee and connection between the bones, because as my knee went backward my bones crashed into each other. No surgery was needed, but I used a knee cast for a while and then pure rehab, slowly regaining mobility and strength."

In May, Garcia competed at the Mexican Championships.  "My performance was exactly as planned," she said. "It was the first competition after my injury so it was to get back in competition form but without doing very difficult skills — letting myself know that I was back in the game. (I did) only bars and beam with full difficulty skills, vault all I did were Yurchenko layouts and on floor I did my first two passes with my coach spotting me, and the rest were very simple tumbling passes."

In June, Garcia won the all around competition at Mexico's National Olympiad with a score of 56.300.  In event finals, she placed third on vault scoring 13.762, third on uneven bars scoring 13.075, first on balance beam scoring 14.200, and second on floor scoring 14.600.  "I recently competed at our country's National Olympiad doing four full routines packed with almost every difficulty I will be showing in London," she said. "Hopefully just missing an upgrade to a double-twisting Yurchenko on vault and a Patterson dismount on beam."

London Olympics 
She was the only Mexico WAG gymnast to compete at the 2012 Summer Olympics in London, United Kingdom.  She injured her hands one day before qualifications and was only able to compete on two events.  She scored 12.400 on balance beam, competing a roundoff Patterson dismount and 13.733 on floor. The music she used on her floor exercise was a fragment of the Zelda Medley by Lindsey Stirling, causing internet and gamer sensation, known as The Zelda Gymnast. 

Beam qualifier: https://www.youtube.com/watch?v=dXot9lhzau0&ab_channel=GymnasticsParadise

Floor qualifier: https://www.youtube.com/watch?v=ytIO0lAN1vY&t=1s&ab_channel=ChainChomp2

Right after the Olympics, Elsa started university at Centros de Estudios Superiores de Diseño de Monterrey CEDIM, where she studied Fashion Design.

She also released an exclusive Elsa Garcia leotard line with Mexican gymnastics activewear brand, Leotardos Gilling.

https://www.cancha.com/aplicaciones/Articulo/Default.aspx?Id=155030

2013 
In 2013 Elsa competed at the 2013 Summer Universiade in Kazan, Russia. She managed to get a medal at the floor final, clinching the silver medal in a tie with Ellie Black, while Ksenia Afanasyeva won gold. Despite her good results at the Universiade she did not go to the world championships later that year. Instead her teammate Amaranta Torres was the lone representative for Mexico at the 2013 World Artistic Gymnastics Championships in Antwerp, Belgium.

Event Final floor: https://www.youtube.com/watch?v=2LN1p2AqtEY&ab_channel=gahpstv

2014 
After missing out most of the season Garcia returned to international competition at the Pan American Senior Championships in August, winning bronze with her team and placing eleventh in the all-around. 

She then was part of the  team at the 2014 World Artistic Gymnastics Championships in Nanning, China. She helped Mexico to achieve one of their best world championships placements at 14th place. Her teammate Alexa Moreno qualified to the vault final and finished 6th while Elsa herself managed to make the all around final for the first time since 2009. 

She also competed at her 4th Central American and Caribbean Games in Veracruz, Mexico. During the games she won gold with the team in her home country and won silver in the all around behind Jessica Lopez of Venezuela.

2015 
Garcia started off the season by sweeping the Mexican National Championships in April. 

In May she competed at the Sao Paulo World Cup, and finished in 4th place in the bars final scoring 14.525. 

Event Final Bars: https://www.youtube.com/watch?v=Mbi55EtCeos&list=PLyPMZ1t17Lk6V-iYnOWpnYMoC3Gj_TTqI&ab_channel=AnaLiviaPlurabelleEsteves 

In July, she competed at the Pan American Games in Toronto, Canada. She contributed to Mexico's fifth place finish in the team final and individually placed fourth on uneven bars.

Event final Bars: https://www.youtube.com/watch?v=Vuy6DJ3cfzo&ab_channel=RodrigoRosales

She was part of the Mexico women national team attending the Glasgow, Scotland 2015 World Championships but sustained serious injuries in both knees while doing vault during podium training and withdrew from competition. This team had high hopes of qualifying a full team to the Rio 2016 Olympics, but Elsa´s injury left them out of the possibility.

2016 
Elsa had a long recovery since last years World Championships and had little time to prepare for the National Team Qualifier  and did not rank among the top two gymnast who would later go to the Rio 2016 Test Event in search of an Olympic spot for the Rio 2016 Olympics.

2017 
She took some time off the sport to focus on her studies, rest and recover her body.

2018 
She had been struggling with severe lower back pain  and on February underwent  a lower back surgery. The surgery consisted of introducing a synthetic ligament between the L4 and L5 lumbar vertebrae giving her a dynamic stability.

She had a long 8 month recovery, and not knowing if she could ever return to competitive high level gymnastics. She started slowly recovering her mobility and strength.

She graduated as a Fashion Designer from CEDIM University  being the valedictorian at the graduation ceremony.

2019 
In April she returned to the national team with high hopes of competing in the upcoming international competitions.

She was called to the Pan American Team for Lima 2019 but declined to go due to an Achilles tendon injury.

In September she competed at the Guimaraes World Cup, placing second place in bars with a score of 13.050 behind teammate Frida Esparza scoring 13.650. 

Event Final Bars routine: https://www.youtube.com/watch?v=H7BO6vM6bsA&ab_channel=LulyRosales

She was part of the Stuttgart, Germany World Championships team, but only competed in 3 events beam, floor and vault, missing out on the opportunity to compete for one of the last places for the Tokio 2020 Olympics.

Podium Training Beam: https://www.youtube.com/watch?v=xNKrT6HkFOY&ab_channel=GymCastic

Floor routine: https://www.youtube.com/watch?v=rbP0vrTfU14&ab_channel=FIGChannel

Vault: https://www.youtube.com/watch?v=B_VXM0IlHR8&ab_channel=FIGChannel

2020 
Given the change of the olympic qualifying standards set by the FIG for this olympic cycle, gymnasts all around the world who had not qualified to the Tokio 2020 olympics still had several ways of earning those last spots. Those being; the individual apparatus World Cups olympic qualifiers, the All Around World Cups qualifiers, and the Continental olympic qualifiers.

The world came to a halt due to the Covid-19 pandemic, and with that all of the competitions in the 2020 calendar were suspended until further noticed and/or canceled.

Elsa, as many athlete's all over the world, trained from home. Having fun with internet challenges, even besting Simone Biles in the handstand challenge pants edition. 

https://www.tiktok.com/@_elsagarcia_/video/6816696080030240005?is_copy_url=1&is_from_webapp=v1

She also took part in a virtual gymnastics class for young gymnasts called "Olympic Gymnastics Workshop", paired with Mexico's best gymnasts such as Denisse Lopez, Brenda Magaña, Alexa Moreno and Daniel Corral. 

In September she got sick from Covid-19. She recalls in the interview with International Gymnast Magazine, ¨I was in complete isolation, but I never felt alone¨ 

After that she slowly regained her high level trainings focusing on next years Continental Championship and hopefully Tokyo 2020 Olympics.

2021 

2021 was still filled with a great deal of uncertainty regarding the international competition calendar, several olympic qualifying competitions got postponed and changed competition venue several times. 

The Mexico national team qualifier towards the Continental PanAmerican Championship was held in Mexico City and consisted of two days of qualifiers and the four best ranked gymnasts were to go to the continental Championship.

Elsa was ranked 2nd in the first day of competition with some minor mistakes, this was her first competition since the start of the pandemic.

Recap 1st day competition: https://www.youtube.com/watch?v=DXxyR6EDjhQ&ab_channel=UngueyGym

The second day of competition she had an ankle injury while doing a beam dismount that prevented her to finish her floor routine and to downgrade her vault. 

The injury affected her scores leaving her out of the possibility to compete at the Continental Championship. 

She then paired with Marca Claro & Claro Sports to be part of the Sport Analyst and Commentator during the Tokio 2020 live transmissions.

She narrated both female and male artistic gymnastics competitions alongside long life coach José Antonio Martinez Barraza.

https://twitter.com/MarcaClaro/status/1415392073675587587

Later in September Elsa Garcia & Luis Peña got married

2022 
She is currently taking some time off gymnastics and the international competition scene, to focus on her personal goals, also to rest and recover her body.

Elsa joined the FIG Safeguarding working group alongside a select group of international gymnasts, coaches, judges, and sport delegates that are working together to make gymnastics a safer and healthier sport.

The Safeguarding working group working with the FIG´s Athlete Commission held the first athlet-led webinar last June. Taking about important matters such as the 10 Golden Rules of Gymnastics , the Gymnastics Ethics Foundation and the new modified FIG Code of Conduct that applies to gymnasts, coaches judges and delegates.

You can watch the full webinar here: https://www.youtube.com/watch?v=0Cxknx2rPec&t=1s&ab_channel=FIGChannel

2023 
García announced her return to competitive gymnastics on March 15th, 2023 via a post on her social media platforms

Notes

References

External links
 
 

1990 births
Living people
Gymnasts at the 2007 Pan American Games
Gymnasts at the 2011 Pan American Games
Gymnasts at the 2015 Pan American Games
Mexican female artistic gymnasts
Sportspeople from Monterrey
Gymnasts at the 2012 Summer Olympics
Olympic gymnasts of Mexico
Pan American Games silver medalists for Mexico
Pan American Games bronze medalists for Mexico
Pan American Games medalists in gymnastics
Universiade medalists in gymnastics
Central American and Caribbean Games gold medalists for Mexico
Central American and Caribbean Games silver medalists for Mexico
Central American and Caribbean Games bronze medalists for Mexico
Competitors at the 2006 Central American and Caribbean Games
Competitors at the 2010 Central American and Caribbean Games
Competitors at the 2014 Central American and Caribbean Games
Universiade silver medalists for Mexico
Central American and Caribbean Games medalists in gymnastics
Medalists at the 2013 Summer Universiade
Medalists at the 2011 Pan American Games
21st-century Mexican women